Jorma Kalevi Peltonen (January 11, 1944 – April 30, 2010) was a Finnish professional ice hockey player who played in the SM-liiga. Born in Messukylä, Finland, he played for Ilves, Jokerit, and Lukko. He was inducted into the Finnish Hockey Hall of Fame in 1987 and died on April 30, 2010 in Tampere, Finland.

External links
Finnish Hockey Hall of Fame page
Jorma Peltonen's obituary

1944 births
2010 deaths
Ice hockey people from Tampere
Olympic ice hockey players of Finland
Ice hockey players at the 1964 Winter Olympics
Ice hockey players at the 1968 Winter Olympics
Ice hockey players at the 1972 Winter Olympics
Ice hockey players with retired numbers
Ilves players
Jokerit players
Lukko players